Screen Digest Ltd was a company providing business intelligence, research and analysis on the global media markets based in London, United Kingdom, that has grown out of a monthly journal of that name that was founded in 1971. It was acquired by the technology researcher iSuppli in 2010, which was in turn acquired by information services company IHS Inc. In 2019, successor company IHS Markit sold most of its Technology, Media and Telecoms division to Informa. In exchange, IHS Markit received Informa's Agriculture Intelligence unit. Informa merged the business with in 2020 to form Omdia.

Company history 
Screen Digest was founded in 1971 by journalist and documentary film-maker John Chittock, then film and video correspondent of the Financial Times, together with his business partner and wife Joy Chittock.  Initially it was a news digest containing abstracts of a range of media, including film and cinema, television and in particular the nascent video sector and with editorial emphasis on the relevance and brevity of stories.

From the first issue, it has been characterised by the use of icons to identify the broad media subject area of each news story and the inclusion of contact information for companies and organisations mentioned in news items.  Other features from the start were the inclusion in the subscription of a free binder and detailed annual index, based on the concept of acting as a journal of record.

In February 1972 a four-page centre section on yellow paper was introduced, initially to carry a page of reference material and articles from members of the industry. Among early contributors were Robert W Sarnoff, then chairman of RCA, film director and teacher Thorold Dickinson and the BBC director-general Charles Curran.  This developed into a data-related eight-page section based on the company's recent research.  Also in that month David Fisher joined as news editor and led in the shaping of the standards of the commercial publication.  He became editor in July 1974 and held that position until January 2011.

In the mid 1970s, Chittock and Fisher produced a daily half-hour closed-circuit radio programme for delegates at the 1976 British Industrial Film Festival in Brighton and repeated the exercise the following year's 18th International Industrial Film Festival at the National Film Theatre in London.

In 1976 Screen Digest formed an alliance with Nord Media, a London-based research business owned by Ebav, an audio-visual company jointly owned by the Scandinavian enterprises Esselte and Bonnier. The partnership ended in May 1980.

Chittock sold the company in July 1996 to a management team comprising David Fisher, Allan Hardy, Ben Keen and Mark Smith. At that time the company had one full-time employee. Since then Screen Digest has expanded its consultancy and report publishing activities, as well as developing a set of continuously updated online information and data services on Advertising, Broadband Media, Cinema, Games, Mobile Media, Television, Television technology and Video. Screen Digest now counts over 50 full-time employees, with bases in New York and California in the US and Melbourne, Australia, as well as London.

In 2007, Screen Digest acquired the US video market research company Adams Media Research (AMR), and established Screen Digest Inc. The Global Media Intelligence (GMI) division was formed in 2007 to supply reports on media companies for corporate investors.

Media conferences
In its association with Nord Media, Screen Digest staged two  video conferences: Video Disc 77 and Video Disc and Videogram 79.

In May 1981 Screen Digest was involved in conference organisation for the International Video Week, co-ordinated by The Economist and held on the South Bank, London. The event was staged again the following year. Several industry lunches were also held in London around this time at which guest speakers included Buckminster Fuller and Rosita Sarnoff, granddaughter of David Sarnoff.

In 1996 Screen Digest became responsible for arranging the conference programme for the annual European Video Perspective (PEVE) home entertainment conferences and in 2007 acquired the sole ownership of the event.

References

External links 
 

Business intelligence companies